Great Dirty World is the third studio album by Canadian musician Lawrence Gowan, originally released in 1987. The album reached multi-platinum status in Canada and spawned the singles, "Moonlight Desires," "Awake the Giant," and "Living in the Golden Age". Jon Anderson of Yes contributed backing vocals to "Moonlight Desires". The album went on to reach #4 in the Canadian charts, surpassing Strange Animal, Gowan's previous album. The album was remastered in 2012, which added new artwork and three re-recorded bonus tracks which were originally from this album.

Track listings 
All songs written and composed by Lawrence Gowan.
 "Moonlight Desires" – 4:13
 "Awake the Giant" – 4:04
 "Living in the Golden Age" – 5:31
 "Dedication" – 4:51
 "Human Drama" – 4:46
 "Forever One" – 4:14
 "One Brief Shining Moment" – 4:42
 "60 Second Nightmare" – 4:27
 "Great Dirty World" – 4:51

Bonus Tracks – 2012 remastered edition 

 Forever One (Piano Version)
 One Brief Shining Moment (Piano Version)
 Great Dirty World (Piano Version)

Personnel 

 Lawrence Gowan – vocals, piano, keyboards
 J. Peter Robinson – keyboards, B3 organ, bass synth, string synth
 Gene Black – guitar
 Tony Levin – bass guitar
 Will Lee – bass guitar
 Terry Gowan – Chapman stick
 Rob Brill – drums, percussion
 Nigel Olsson – drums
 Brandon Fields – saxophone
 Deborah Silver – background vocals
 Kaz Silver-Lee – background vocals
 Jon Anderson – special guest vocalist on "Moonlight Desires"
 The San Fernando Valley Men's Choir and Choral Singers –  choir (arranged and conducted by Bob Ezrin)

Singles

References 

1987 albums
Columbia Records albums
Lawrence Gowan albums
Albums produced by David Tickle